Pycnomalla is a genus of flies in the family Stratiomyidae.

Species
Pycnomalla aterrima Sack, 1911
Pycnomalla auriflua (Erichson, 1841)
Pycnomalla splendens (Fabricius, 1787)

References

Stratiomyidae
Brachycera genera
Taxa named by Carl Eduard Adolph Gerstaecker
Diptera of Africa
Diptera of Europe